The Szlakiem Walk Majora Hubala is a multi-day road cycling race held annually in Poland. It was first held in 2000 and was part of the UCI Europe Tour in category 1.2 in 2005 and 2.2 from 2007 to 2010. The race was discontinued in 2010 until 2016 when it was revived. In 2017, the race re-entered UCI Europe Tour in category 2.1.

The race pays tribute to Major Henryk Dobrzański (nicknamed "Hubal").

Winners

References

Cycle races in Poland
2000 establishments in Poland
Recurring sporting events established in 2000
UCI Europe Tour races